Ahmed Mater (born 1979, Tabuk, Saudi Arabia) is a Saudi artist and physician. His mediums are photography, calligraphy, painting, installation, performance and video. His work, which explores history, the narratives and aesthetics of Islamic culture, and addresses consumerism and transformation taking place in the region and its effects on geopolitics, has attracted an international audience. In 2003, he cofounded "Edge of Arabia", an independent arts initiative dedicated to promoting the appreciation of contemporary Arab art and culture, with a focus on Saudi Arabia.

Life and career

Ahmed Mater was born in 1979 in Tabuk in the north west of Saudi Arabia on the Jordanian border. He is the first child of Mater Ahmed Al-Ziad, a sergeant in the Saudi Arabian Army, and Fatimah Hassan Abdullah Aseeri, a calligrapher and painter of traditional Aseeri houses. Ahmed has two brothers, Bandar and Mohamed, and four sisters, Aicha, Jawaher, Jamila and Reem.

In the 1990s Mater was given a studio space in Abha at the al-Meftaha artists' village. He splits his time between the Saudi Arabian cities of Abha, Jeddah and Makkah. He is currently in Riyadh running his personal studio (Ahmed Mater Studio) and working as a consultant in the Saudi Ministry of Culture. Also a board member in Misk Art Institute.

Work

Mater's work has been exhibited internationally and acquired by major international museums. Illuminations, acquired by The British Museum, is a series that combines explicit notes from his medical education with images of the Kaaba and a mosque, distributed as a collage around blue and black x-ray images.  The work seems to ask the viewer if humanity is more than just the structure of the body.

In 2006, Mater mounted an installation titled The Yellow Cow products, a work that address ecological challenges of modern urbanized society.  According to the artist, "The cow with the yellow color was used as an expression of religious heritage."

His Desert of Pharan series features photographs and films gathered over five-years, documenting the changes taking place in Islam's holiest city. Mater considers the unprecedented redevelopment of the Masjid Al-Haram, including a multibillion-dollar complex of luxury hotels, malls and apartments.

Magnetism is a black cuboid magnet surrounded by iron filings to represent Hajj, Muslim's annual pilgrimage which includes the circumambulation of the Kaaba.

Exhibitions

 Selected solo shows
2001 Landing on the Earth's Surface, Al-Maseef Culture Club, Abha, KSA

2003 X-Ray Project – 6th Saudi Malwan Contest Tour, Jeddah, Beirut, Sidon and Manama (Jun10 – Sept 25)

2004 Standing in Front of You, King Khaled University, Abha, KSA.

2004 Chewing (Mudgah), Almiftaha Arts Village, Abha, KSA.

2004 The End – Al Meftaha Arts Village, Abha (Dec15 – Dec30)

2006 Ahmed Mater Al Ziad Aseeri -Royal Embassy of Saudi Arabia, London (May 12)

2006 Son of Aseer- Al Meftaha Arts Village, Abha (Oct10 – Oct30)

2009 Illumination, Art Space, Dubai (Mar15 – Apr 15)

2010 Ahmed Mater, The Vinyl Factory Gallery, London (Oct 11 – 31)

2013 100 Found Objects, Sharjah Art Foundation, Sharjah, UAE

2016 Symbolic Cities: The Work of Ahmed Mater, Smithsonian, Arthur M. Sackler Gallery Washington, US

2016 Evolution of Man at Standing Rock, North Dakota

2017 Mitochondria: Powerhouses at GALLERIA CONTINUA San Gimignano, Italy (September 23, 2017 – January 7, 2018)

2017 Ahmed Mater: Mecca Journeys, Brooklyn Museum, New York City (December 1, 2017 – April 8, 2018)

Publications and monographs

2006 Word into Art: Artists of the Modern Middle East, British Museum Press

2009  ADACH Platform for Visual Arts in Venice, Catherine David

2009  New Vision: Arab Contemporary Art in the 21st Century, Thames & Hudson

2010  Art of the Middle East: Modern and Contemporary Art of the Arab World and Iran, Merrell Publishing

2010 Ahmed Mater (Monograph), Booth Clibborn Editions

2012 Edge of Arabia, Contemporary Art from the Kingdom of Saudi Arabia, Booth-Clibborn Editions

2012 Hajj: Journey to the Heart of Islam, British Museum Press

2016 Desert of Pharan: Unofficial Histories Behind the Mass Expansion of Mecca, Lars Müller Publishing

See also
 Islamic art
 Islamic calligraphy

References

External links
 Official Ahmed Mater Website
 Saudi Artist Ahmed Mater at the Louvre Asharq Alawsat Newspaper
 Ahmed Mater Flickr

Living people
1979 births
King Khalid University alumni
Saudi Arabian general practitioners
People from Tabuk, Saudi Arabia
Saudi Arabian artists
Saudi Arabian contemporary artists